Khumanthem Ninthoinganba Meetei (born 13 July 2001), commonly known as Ninthoi, is an Indian professional footballer who plays as a winger for Indian Super League club Chennaiyin.

Career
Born in Manipur, Meetei was part of the AIFF Elite Academy batch that was preparing for the 2017 FIFA U-17 World Cup to be hosted in India. After the tournament, Meetei was selected to play for the Indian Arrows, an All India Football Federation-owned team that would consist of India under-20 players to give them playing time. He made his professional debut for the side 5 December 2017 against Minerva Punjab. He came on as an 85th-minute substitute as Indian Arrows lost 2–0.

NorthEast United
Ninthoinganba Meetei, fondly known as Ninthoi was signed by NorthEast United following a terrific 2018-19 campaign for the Indian Arrows on a 3 years deal. Ninthoi had a formidable Indian Super League debut with NorthEast United, making 11 appearances and averaging 18 passes per game. Retained ahead of the 2020-21 season, he will look to play a telling role for the Highlanders.

Chennaiyin
On 7 September 2021, Chennaiyin announced that they had completed the signing of Ninthoi on a three-year deal.

International
Meetei represented the India under-17 side which participated in the 2017 FIFA U-17 World Cup which was hosted in India.

He won the Most Valuable Player Award in 2019 SAFF U-18 Championship.

Career statistics

Club

Honours
India U-19
SAFF U-18 Championship: 2019

References

2001 births
Living people
People from Imphal
Indian footballers
AIFF Elite Academy players
Indian Arrows players
Association football midfielders
Footballers from Manipur
I-League players
India youth international footballers
Indian Super League players
NorthEast United FC players